John Isner was the defending champion, but lost in the second round to Dustin Brown.

Fernando Verdasco won the title, defeating Nicolás Almagro in the final, 6–3, 7–6(7–4).

Seeds
The top four seeds received a bye into the second round.

 John Isner (second round)
 Tommy Robredo (second round)
 Nicolás Almagro (final)
 Fernando Verdasco (champion)
 Feliciano López (second round, retired)
 Juan Mónaco (second round)
 Lleyton Hewitt (second round)
 Ivo Karlović (first round)

Draw

Finals

Top half

Bottom half

Qualifying

Seeds

 Ryan Harrison (qualified)
 Alex Kuznetsov (first round)
 Peter Polansky (qualified)
 Wayne Odesnik (first round)
 Thiemo de Bakker (qualifying competition)
 Ruben Bemelmans (qualifying competition)
 Rubén Ramírez Hidalgo (qualified)
 Illya Marchenko (second round)

Qualifiers

  Ryan Harrison
  Robby Ginepri
  Peter Polansky

Qualifying draw

First qualifier

Second qualifier

Third qualifier

Fourth qualifier

References

Main Draw
Qualifying Draw

Singles
2014 - Singles